Terje Kojedal (born 16 August 1957) is a Norwegian former professional footballer who played as a defender for HamKam in Norway and FC Mulhouse and US Valenciennes-Anzin in France. He was capped 66 times for Norway and participated in the 1984 Summer Olympics.

Kojedal also played ice hockey for Storhamar.

Football career

Club career
Kojedal played for HamKam in Norway, until he was brought to FC Mulhouse in France by Raymond Domenech in 1985. During Kojedal's three seasons at the club, Mulhouse were playing in the French Division 2, and qualified for promotion-playoff, but the team didn't won promotion. He also spent one seasons in US Valenciennes, before he returned to Norway and HamKam in 1989.

International career
Kojedal made his international debut on 19 October 1974, when Norway U16 met Denmark U16. He then played one match for Norway U19, before he got 23 matches for Norway U21.

Kojedal made his debut for the senior team in a friendly match against Nigeria on 12 August 1981. Three years later, he was a member of the Norwegian Olympic team which participated at the 1984 Summer Olympics in Los Angeles, California. Kojedal scored his first and only international goal in the friendly match against Austria on 31 May 1989 which Norway won 4–1. When he played his last match for Norway on 15 November 1989, he had been capped 66 times including 11 matches for the Olympic team.

Coaching career
Kojedal coached HamKam along with Viggo Sundmoen in 1998 when the team was relegated from the First Division.

Ice hockey career
He also played ice hockey for Storhamar before quitting hockey in 1980 to focus on football. He played more than a hundred games and scored five goals in one game against Oppsal.

References

1957 births
Living people
Norwegian footballers
Norway international footballers
Olympic footballers of Norway
Hamarkameratene players
FC Mulhouse players
Valenciennes FC players
Footballers at the 1984 Summer Olympics
Kniksen Award winners
Storhamar Dragons players
People from Røros
Norwegian expatriate footballers
Expatriate footballers in France
Norwegian ice hockey players
Norwegian football managers
Hamarkameratene managers
Association football defenders
Sportspeople from Trøndelag